Kim Min-jun (born 9 January 2000) is a South Korean footballer currently playing as a goalkeeper for Gyeongnam.

Career statistics

Club

Notes

References

External links

2000 births
Living people
South Korean footballers
South Korean expatriate footballers
Association football goalkeepers
J3 League players
Shonan Bellmare players
Fukushima United FC players
Gyeongnam FC players
South Korean expatriate sportspeople in Japan
Expatriate footballers in Japan